Strength is a disco-rock band from Portland, Oregon, made up of Bailey Winters, John Zeigler, and Patrick Morris.  Their 2006 debut album, Going Strong, on Community Disco, was produced and recorded by Chris Anderson at Animal Kingdom, and mastered by Nilesh Patel at The Exchange.

Their second album, Mind-Reader, was self-recorded and then mixed by Jake Portrait at the Odditorium and Wave Cave in Portland.  It was also mastered by Nilesh Patel at The Exchange.

Members
Bailey Winters - lead vocals
John Zeigler - keyboards, synth bass, backup vocals
Patrick Morris - guitar, mpc, bass, backup vocals

Discography
Going Strong (2006)
Mind-Reader (2010)

External links
Strength's Official Site
Strength's Myspace Page
Strength on Facebook

Musical groups from Portland, Oregon